Out in the Ring is a Canadian documentary film, directed by Ry Levey and released in 2022. The film is a history of LGBTQ representation in the sport of professional wrestling, featuring figures such as Chyna, Lisa Marie Varon, Nyla Rose, Chris Kanyon, Pat Patterson, Valerie Wyndham, Dani Jordyn, Cassandro, Charlie Morgan, Sandy Parker, Sonny Kiss, Pollo Del Mar, Sue Green,Dark Sheik and Wade Keller.

The film began development in the late 2010s, and faced some production delays caused by the COVID-19 pandemic.

The film premiered in June 2022 at the Inside Out Film and Video Festival, where it won the juried award for Best Canadian Film.

See also
 :Category:LGBT professional wrestlers

References

External links
 
 

2022 films
2022 documentary films
2022 LGBT-related films
Canadian sports documentary films
Canadian LGBT-related films
Documentary films about LGBT sportspeople
2020s English-language films
English-language Canadian films
Professional wrestling documentary films
Canadian wrestling films
2020s Canadian films